was a Japanese businessman from the early Shōwa period (1920s–1970s). The chief of Nippon Keidanren in 1968, he served as President of the Sapporo Olympic Organizing Committee, and served as Chairman of the National Board of the Boy Scouts of Japan.

Background
Uemura was a graduate of Tokyo's Hibiya High School.

In 1978 he received the highest distinction of the Scout Association of Japan, the Golden Pheasant Award.

References

External links

Scouting in Japan
1894 births
Presidents of the Organising Committees for the Olympic Games
1978 deaths